Cottage to Let is a 1941 British spy thriller film directed by Anthony Asquith starring Leslie Banks, Alastair Sim and John Mills. Filmed during the Second World War and set in Scotland during the war, its plot concerns Nazi spies trying to kidnap an inventor.

The film was shot at the Lime Grove Studios in London, with sets designed by the art director Alex Vetchinsky. The film includes the first appearance of George Cole, superbly confident as a cocky young evacuee.

Plot
John Barrington (Leslie Banks) is a talented inventor, currently working on a bombsight for the Royal Air Force. who prefers to work in his own country house in the Highlands of Scotland near Loch Tay. His eccentric wife (Jeanne de Casalis) has agreed to take in child evacuees from London to be accommodated in a nearby cottage they own. However, also arriving is Charles Dimble (Alastair Sim) to whom the cottage has been let by the letting agency. To compound the confusion, Mrs. Barrington had also agreed to allow it to be converted into a military hospital. Therefore, Mrs Barrington decides she can only take one evacuee, which turns out to be cocky teenager, Ronald (George Cole).

An injured pilot who has parachuted into the nearby loch is rescued and brought to the house, becoming the first patient for the new hospital. Mrs. Barrington moves Ronald to the main house, while Dimble and the pilot remain in the cottage. After his injuries are treated by Mrs. Barrington's daughter Helen (Carla Lehmann), the pilot identifies himself as Flight Lieutenant Perry, flying Spitfires from a nearby airfield. However, when he is given a telephone to call his base, he makes the call, overheard by Helen, with the telephone disconnected from the socket.

The War Office discuss Barrington, concerned that someone is spying on his work, since his last invention, a self-sealing fuel tank, was copied by the Germans within a month of its mass production. They suspect his assistant Alan Trently (Michael Wilding), who although British was educated in Germany and still corresponds with people in Switzerland, and it is mentioned that they have sent someone to the house to investigate.

Defying the house rule, Ronald goes into the laboratory. He overcomes Barrington's initial hostility with his practical knowhow and the two become friendly. Trently becomes jealous when Helen starts spending time with Perry. However, Helen resists Perry's advances and eventually lets Trently know that she prefers him.

German agents make their move and kidnap Barrington. Ronald stows away in the car used to take the captive to an isolated water mill. When Perry shows up, Ronald attacks one of the spies to help in the "rescue", but is shocked when Perry is revealed to be the agents' ringleader and intends to take Barrington to Berlin on a seaplane which is due to arrive in the loch the next night.

It turns out that Dimble is the British counterintelligence officer sent by the War Office. He manages to infiltrate the spy ring and learn where Barrington is being held. All but one of the spies are captured and the prisoners are freed. Perry initially escapes, but is eventually tracked down and killed in a shootout with Dimble.

Cast
Leslie Banks as John Barrington
Alastair Sim as Charles Dimble
John Mills as Flight Lieutenant Perry
Jeanne de Casalis as Mrs. Barrington
Carla Lehmann as Helen Barrington
George Cole as Ronald
Michael Wilding as Alan Trently
Frank Cellier as Ernest Forest
Muriel Aked as Miss Fernery
Wally Patch as Evans
Muriel George as Mrs. Trimm
Hay Petrie as Dr. Truscott
Catherine Lacey as Mrs. Stokes
 Annie Esmond as Lady wrapping parcels for the bazaar (uncredited) 
Peter Gawthorne as Senior RAF officer (uncredited) 
Arthur Hambling as Scotland Yard Inspector (uncredited) 
 Roddy Hughes as German agent (uncredited) 
 Brefni O'Rorke as Scottish Police Inspector (uncredited) 
 Charles Rolfe as German agent (uncredited) 
 Ben Williams as Scottish fisherman (uncredited)

Bibliography
 Ryall, Tom. Anthony Asquith. Manchester University Press, 2013.

References

External links 
 
 
 
 

1941 films
British black-and-white films
British spy films
British World War II propaganda films
Films directed by Anthony Asquith
World War II spy films
1940s spy films
1940s English-language films
Gainsborough Pictures films
Films shot at Lime Grove Studios
Films set in London
Films set in Scotland